Jack William Robbins (January 23, 1916 – January 1983) was an American football halfback who played two seasons in the National Football League (NFL) for the Chicago Cardinals. Robbins also played quarterback during his two years in the NFL.

Robbins played college football and basketball at the University of Arkansas before being drafted into the NFL Draft in 1938, where he was the first of four Arkansas Razorbacks drafted.

References

 

1916 births
1983 deaths
Little Rock Central High School alumni
Sportspeople from Little Rock, Arkansas
Arkansas Razorbacks football players
Arkansas Razorbacks men's basketball players
Chicago Cardinals players
Players of American football from Arkansas
American men's basketball players